Pimoidae is a small family of araneomorph spiders first described by J. Wunderlich in 1986. As re-circumscribed in 2021, it is monophyletic, and contained 85 species in two genera. It is closely related to the Linyphiidae, and is sometimes treated as synonymous with that family.

The species Pimoa cthulhu, described by Gustavo Hormiga in 1994, is named for Howard Phillips Lovecraft's mythological deity Cthulhu.

Distribution
The ancestors of the family are thought to have been widely distributed across the Palearctic, Nearctic and Sino-Japanese regions, but species now have a more fragmented distribution.

Genera and species

, the World Spider Catalog accepted the following genera and species:

Nanoa Hormiga, Buckle & Scharff, 2005
Nanoa enana Hormiga, Buckle & Scharff, 2005 — USA

Pimoa Chamberlin & Ivie, 1943 — North America, Asia, Europe
Pimoa altioculata (Keyserling, 1886) – USA, Canada
Pimoa anatolica Hormiga, 1994 – China
Pimoa anning Zhang & Li, 2021 – China
Pimoa binchuanensis Zhang & Li, 2019 – China
Pimoa bomi Zhang & Li, 2021 – China
Pimoa breuili (Fage, 1931) – Spain
Pimoa breviata Chamberlin & Ivie, 1943 – USA
Pimoa cawarong Zhang & Li, 2021 – China
Pimoa clavata Xu & Li, 2007 – China
Pimoa cona Zhang & Li, 2020 – China
Pimoa crispa (Fage, 1946) – India
Pimoa cthulhu Hormiga, 1994 – USA
Pimoa curvata Chamberlin & Ivie, 1943 – USA
Pimoa daman Zhang & Li, 2021 – Nepal
Pimoa danba Zhang & Li, 2021 – China
Pimoa delphinica Mammola, Hormiga & Isaia, 2016 – Italy
Pimoa deqen Zhang & Li, 2021 – China
Pimoa dongjiu Zhang & Li, 2021 – China
Pimoa duiba Zhang & Li, 2020 – China
Pimoa edenticulata Hormiga, 1994 – USA
Pimoa exigua Irfan, Wang & Zhang, 2021 – China
Pimoa gagna Zhang & Li, 2021 – India
Pimoa gandhii Hormiga, 1994 – India
Pimoa graphitica Mammola, Hormiga & Isaia, 2016 – Italy, France
Pimoa guiqing Zhang & Li, 2021 – China
Pimoa gyaca Zhang & Li, 2021 – China
Pimoa gyara Zhang & Li, 2021 – China
Pimoa gyirong Zhang & Li, 2021 – China
Pimoa haden Chamberlin & Ivie, 1943 – USA
Pimoa heishui Zhang & Li, 2021 – China
Pimoa hespera (Gertsch & Ivie, 1936) (type species) – USA
Pimoa indiscreta Hormiga, 1994 – India
Pimoa jellisoni (Gertsch & Ivie, 1936) – USA
Pimoa jinchuan Zhang & Li, 2021 – China
Pimoa khaptad Zhang & Li, 2021 – Nepal
Pimoa koshi Zhang & Li, 2021 – Nepal
Pimoa lata Xu & Li, 2009 – China
Pimoa laurae Hormiga, 1994 – USA
Pimoa lemenba Zhang & Li, 2020 – China
Pimoa lhatog Zhang & Li, 2021 – China
Pimoa lihengae Griswold, Long & Hormiga, 1999 – China
Pimoa mainling Zhang & Li, 2020 – China
Pimoa mechi Zhang & Li, 2021 – Nepal
Pimoa mephitis Hormiga, 1994 – USA
Pimoa miandam Zhang & Li, 2021 – Pakistan
Pimoa miero Zhang & Li, 2021 – China
Pimoa mono Hormiga, 1994 – USA
Pimoa mude Zhang & Li, 2021 – Nepal
Pimoa muli Zhang & Li, 2021 – China
Pimoa nainital Zhang & Li, 2021 – India
Pimoa naran Zhang & Li, 2021 – Pakistan
Pimoa nematoides Hormiga, 1994 – Nepal
Pimoa ninglang Zhang & Li, 2021 – China
Pimoa nyalam Zhang & Li, 2021 – China
Pimoa nyingchi Zhang & Li, 2020 – China
Pimoa petita Hormiga, 1994 – USA
Pimoa phaplu Zhang & Li, 2021 – Nepal
Pimoa pingwuensis Irfan, Wang, Zhao & Zhang, 2022 – China
Pimoa putou Zhang & Li, 2021 – China
Pimoa rara Zhang & Li, 2021 – Nepal
Pimoa reniformis Xu & Li, 2007 – China
Pimoa rongxar Zhang & Li, 2020 – China
Pimoa rupicola (Simon, 1884) – France, Italy
Pimoa samyai Zhang & Li, 2020 – China
Pimoa sangri Zhang & Li, 2021 – China
Pimoa shigatse Zhang & Li, 2021 – China
Pimoa shoja Zhang & Li, 2021 – India
Pimoa sinuosa Hormiga, 1994 – Nepal
Pimoa tehama Hormiga & Lew, 2014 – USA
Pimoa tengchong Zhang & Li, 2021 – China
Pimoa thaleri Trotta, 2009 – India
Pimoa trifurcata Xu & Li, 2007 – China
Pimoa vera Gertsch, 1951 – USA
Pimoa wanglangensis Yuan, Zhao & Zhang, 2019 – China
Pimoa wulipoensis Irfan, Wang & Zhang, 2021 – China
Pimoa xiahe Zhang & Li, 2021 – China
Pimoa xinjianensis Zhang & Li, 2019 – China
Pimoa yadong Zhang & Li, 2020 – China
Pimoa yajiangensis Irfan, Wang, Zhao & Zhang, 2022 – China
Pimoa yejiei Zhang & Li, 2021 – China
Pimoa yele Zhang & Li, 2021 – China
Pimoa zayu Zhang & Li, 2021 – China
Pimoa zekogensis Irfan, Wang, Zhao & Zhang, 2022 – China
Pimoa zhigangi Zhang & Li, 2021 – China

References

 
Araneomorphae families